The 1994–95 OPJHL season is the second season of the Ontario Provincial Junior A Hockey League (OPJHL). The nine teams of the East Division competed in a 48-game schedule, while the eight teams of the West Division played a 49-game schedule.  The top 8 teams of each division make the playoffs.

The winner of the OPJHL playoffs, the Brampton Capitals, won the 1996 Buckland Cup but failed to win the Dudley Hewitt Cup as Central Canadian champions.

Changes
Lindsay Bears become the Lindsay Muskies.

Final standings

Note: GP = Games played; W = Wins; L = Losses; OTL = Overtime losses; SL = Shootout losses; GF = Goals for; GA = Goals against; PTS = Points; x = clinched playoff berth; y = clinched division title; z = clinched conference title

1994-95 OPJHL Playoffs

Division Quarter-final
Newmarket 87's defeated Peterborough Jr. Petes 4-games-to-none
Barrie Colts defeated Orillia Terriers 4-games-to-none
Lindsay Muskies defeated Markham Waxers 4-games-to-none
Cobourg Cougars defeated Collingwood Blues 4-games-to-none
Milton Merchants defeated Georgetown Raiders 4-games-to-none
Streetsville Derbys defeated Royal York Rangers 4-games-to-none
Oakville Blades defeated Hamilton Kiltys 4-games-to-2
Brampton Capitals defeated Burlington Cougars 4-games-to-1
Division Semi-final
Newmarket 87's defeated Cobourg Cougars 4-games-to-none
Barrie Colts defeated Lindsay Muskies 4-games-to-2
Oakville Blades defeated Milton Merchants 4-games-to-3
Brampton Capitals defeated Streetsville Derbys 4-games-to-none
Division Final
Barrie Colts defeated Newmarket 87's 4-games-to-3
Brampton Capitals defeated Oakville Blades 4-games-to-none
Final
Brampton Capitals defeated Barrie Colts 4-games-to-none

OHA Buckland Cup and Dudley Hewitt Cup Championship
The 1995 Dudley Hewitt Cup was hosted by the Thunder Bay Flyers of Thunder Bay, Ontario.  The Brampton Capitals lost in the final.

Round Robin
Brampton Capitals defeated Caledon Canadians (MetJHL) 4-1
Brampton Capitals defeated Timmins Golden Bears (NOJHL) 5-3
Brampton Capitals defeated Thunder Bay Flyers (USHL) 5-2

Final
Thunder Bay Flyers (USHL) defeated Brampton Capitals 6-4

Scoring leaders
Note: GP = Games played; G = Goals; A = Assists; Pts = Points; PIM = Penalty minutes

See also
 1995 Centennial Cup
 Dudley Hewitt Cup
 List of OJHL seasons
 Northern Ontario Junior Hockey League
 Superior International Junior Hockey League
 Greater Ontario Junior Hockey League
 1994 in ice hockey
 1995 in ice hockey

References

External links
 Official website of the Ontario Junior Hockey League
 Official website of the Canadian Junior Hockey League

Ontario Junior Hockey League seasons
OPJHL